Mkhuphali "Mike" Masuku (born 28 March 1980) is a Zimbabwean football manager and former player. He played club football for Highlanders FC and represented the Zimbabwe national football team.

Career
Born in Gwanda, Masuku began playing football with the youth sides of Gwanda and Amazulu FC (Bulawayo). He played for Amazulu FC's senior side, where he would win the Zimbabwe Premier Soccer League, Independence Trophy and the Madison Trophy. Masuku was capped by Zimbabwe at youth and senior levels while with AmaZulu. He moved to Highlanders where he again won the league in 2006.

After he retired from playing, Masuku became a football coach. He has managed Bulawayo side Highlanders. In September Mohammed Fathi resigned and Highlanders assistant coach Mkhuphali Masuku was elevated to caretaker coach and managed to guide the Bulawayo outfit to a respectable third position after winning 10 and drawing two matches.

After winning the 2011 Independence Trophy with Highlanders, he was appointed manager of CAPS United in 2012.

References

External links

1980 births
Living people
Zimbabwean footballers
Zimbabwe international footballers
Zimbabwean football managers
Association football midfielders
Amazulu F.C. (Zimbabwe) players
Highlanders F.C. players
Highlanders F.C. managers